The Men's individual time trial events at the 2008 Summer Paralympics took place on September 12 at the Changping Triathlon Venue.

Handcycle classes

HC A 

The Men's individual time trial HC A event took place at 10:32.

HC B 

The Men's individual time trial HC B event took place at 10:15.

HC C 

The Men's individual time trial HC C event took place at 10:00.

Cerebral palsy classes

CP 3 

The Men's individual time trial CP 3 event took place at 11:16.

CP 4 

The Men's individual time trial CP 4 event took place at 11:27.

Locomotor disability classes

LC 1 

The Men's individual time trial LC 1 event took place at 14:00.

Note: Rider # 29 add nine seconds to his time for starting in the wrong side

LC 2 

The Men's individual time trial LC 2 event took place at 14:18.

LC 3 

The Men's individual time trial LC 3 event took place at 14:31.

LC 4 

The Men's individual time trial LC 4 event took place at 14:46.

Blind & visually impaired class

B&VI 1-3 

The Men's individual time trial B&VI 1-3 event took place at 15:31.

References

Cycling at the 2008 Summer Paralympics